Thecaphora was also proposed for the order of cnidarians usually known as Leptomedusae.

Thecaphora  is a genus of basidiomycote fungus which contains several species of plant pathogens.  The widespread genus contain 57 species.

Species
Thecaphora arnicae Vánky (2009)
Thecaphora capensis Roets & L.L. Dreyer (2008
Thecaphora cerastii M. Lutz & Vánky (2007)
Thecaphora deformans (Durieu & Mont. (1847)
Thecaphora frezii Carranza and Lindquist (1962)
Thecaphora hosackiae Vánky (2008)
Thecaphora lathyri (J.G.Kühn (1873)
Thecaphora oxalidis (Ellis & Tracy) M. Lutz, R. Bauer & Piatek (2008)
Thecaphora oxytropis
Thecaphora saponariae
Thecaphora seminis-convolvuli ((Duby) Liro (1935)
Thecaphora smallanthi
Thecaphora solidaginis (Ellis & Everh.) Vánky (2009)
Thecaphora solani (Barrus 1944), potato smut
Thecaphora trailii ((Cooke) Vestergr. (1902)
Thecaphora ulicis Vánky (2008)

References

External links
 genus Thecaphora
Cazón I, Conforto C, Fernández FD, Paredes JA, Rago AM. 2016. Molecular detection of Thecaphora frezii in peanut (Arachis hypogaea L.) seeds. Journal of Plant Pathology http://dx.doi.org/10.4454/JPP.V98I2.034

Ustilaginomycotina
Basidiomycota genera